Inter Football Club was an Italian sports magazine entirely dedicated to the football club Inter. It was released on a monthly basis. It featured articles, posters and photos of Inter Milan players including both the first and junior team players, as well as some of the club employees. It also featured anecdotes and famous episodes from the club's history. Initially edited by Susanna Wermelinger, the magazine ceased to be published in 2009 when Francesco Sordano was at the helm. In 2017 the magazine was replaced by a weekly publication called Match Day Programme, which is issued every weekend when Internazionale is playing.

See also
 List of magazines in Italy

References

External links
 Official website 

1960 establishments in Italy
2009 disestablishments in Italy
Association football magazines
Defunct magazines published in Italy
Inter Milan
Italian-language magazines
Magazines established in 1960
Magazines disestablished in 2009
Magazines published in Milan
Monthly magazines published in Italy
Sports mass media in Italy